Hornepayne is a township of 980 people (Canada 2016 Census) in the Algoma District of Ontario, Canada.  The town was established in 1915 as Fitzback when the Canadian Northern Railway's transcontinental line was built through the area.  It was renamed Hornepayne in 1920 after British financier Robert Horne-Payne. The municipality was originally named Wicksteed Township after the geographic township in which it is located. It was renamed Hornepayne, after its primary community, in 1986.

History

First Nations people have lived in the area for centuries, as indicated by archaeological evidence such as potsherd fragments. In the 19th century, they became involved in the fur trade and the mercantile activities of the Hudson's Bay Company. By the early 1900s, they consisted of three Cree families living at Lake Nagagamisis, along with a number of Ojibwe who were possibly originally from Heron Bay. With the opening of the railway, they abandoned their existing trading post on Lake Nagagamisis in 1926 for a new settlement on Shekak Lake, which was closer to the rail line. By the 1940s, many of them had moved to Hornepayne to work in the railway and timber industries based in the town. A number of their descendants are members of the Hornepayne First Nation, a member organization of the Nishnawbe Aski Nation.

Hornepayne differs from a number of older Northern Ontario settlements due to its distance from major waterways, making it relatively inaccessible before the advent of rail transportation in the north. The townsite was originally surveyed in 1877, when possible routes for the Canadian Pacific Railway transcontinental mainline were being explored. Instead of Canadian Pacific, however, Hornepayne would become associated with the Canadian Northern Railway (CNoR), one of several railways which were later amalgamated into the Canadian National Railways (CN) system during the 20th century. The Canadian Northern built its line through the area in 1915 and established a divisional point on the line called Fitzback. In 1919, the Canadian Northern was amalgamated into the Canadian National system. A year later, in 1920, the point was renamed Hornepayne, after the railway financier Robert Montgomery Horne-Payne.

In the steam era, the railway system was labour-intensive and required many workers for maintenance of way, crew changes, and to resupply trains with coal and water at fixed intervals. This circumstance fostered the growth of "railway towns", as railway workers began to create permanent settlements to live in with their families. Divisional points acted as a sort of local "headquarters" for the railways, and were very important for their operations. Additionally, most steam trains needed to be resupplied with coal at least once and water at least three times when passing through each subdivision, requiring railways to maintain even more permanent or semi-permanent settlements to support these operations. Hornepayne, as a divisional point, sat at the joining place between the CN Oba Subdivision (east to Foleyet) and the CN Caramat Subdivision (west to Nakina).

Hornepayne initially had few permanent structures aside from the railway station, but was inhabited mostly by railway workers, who were young and well-paid for the era. A one-room schoolhouse was constructed in 1921 at the corner of First and Front streets, partially replacing the railway coach which was previously used as a school, though senior students were shifted to the old railway station. A new railway station, which was demolished in 2020, was also constructed in 1921. The situation was resolved when town ratepayers authorized $30,000 be spent on the construction of a new four-room school in the winter of 1923.

Throughout the 1920s, Hornepayne grew, and soon was home to several grocery and general stores, as well as a butcher shop, a dress shop, a pharmacy, a Hudson's Bay Company store, two barbershops, a town hall, two restaurants, a bowling alley, two pool halls, and two hotels, one of which was owned by CN and one of which was independent. The town lacked in fresh fruit and vegetables early on, which were imported by rail from Port Arthur. Later, two farms, one of which was a dairy farm, were established in the area to feed the town. By the 1930s, one farm had around four hundred chickens. Due to its remote location, household electricity was slow to arrive in Hornepayne. Diesel-generated power was available from CN for most of the town starting in the 1930s, but the town would only be connected with the Ontario electrical grid in 1962.

The town was incorporated in 1927–28 by local petition, and was poised to become a regional centre. A series of devastating fires in 1929–31, however, destroyed many of the town's commercial buildings, as well as the CNR shops. Rail traffic slowed during the Great Depression, and the town struggled, with some residents finding employment on highway construction under government public works funding.

In the 1970s and 1980s, Hornepayne underwent a considerable redevelopment push, spurring the southern highway extension, the opening of the Hornepayne Municipal Airport, and the creation of the mixed use Hallmark Centre "mall", merging together a number of commercial, recreational, and institutional aspects of the town. At various times, it included residences for CN temporary workers (an evolution of the CN bunkhouses which were demolished in the 1950s), a post office, the local high school, a hotel, a library, a swimming pool, a gym, apartments, and a Hudson's Bay Company Northern Store department store. Many existing businesses relocated to the complex, though some remained at their old locations. Over the years, the complex became less and less commercially viable, and closed entirely in 2011.

Geography

Geology
Hornepayne is situated in the Horseshoe of Rock, which forms the Pre-Cambrian area, which surrounds Hudson Bay.  It is the oldest rock in the world, containing the famous Keewatin Greenstone. Massive Granite intrusions, of which Tank Hill to is a good example, is the predominant rock in the area.

Greenstone can be found six miles north along highway 631 and in numerous bands along Government Lake Road. Volcanoes were numerous, and specimens of their eruptions in the soil can be found today. The Pre-Cambrian was covered by at least three Ice Ages which, with glaciers miles high, bulldozed the mountains away just as a bulldozer today would level a small hill. The rock and earth were moved as far south as Wisconsin.

Evidence of glacial scratches can be found on Tank Hill. The sand hills near Cedar Point are eskers left by the Glaciers.  Boulders, small rocks, and clay, are scattered throughout the area, part of the glacial wash. A typical volcanic core is to be found about five miles north. The highway runs through it. Samples of volcanics, such as garnets, serpentine, and rhyolite, can be found. Most of the Pre-Cambrian is covered by a thin layer of organic soil and clay. Hornepayne is approximately eight miles north of the height of land. Drainage is poor in the area, which has many muskeg swamps.

Climate
Hornepayne experiences a unique subarctic microclimate (Dfc) due to its elevation of 336 meters (1,101 feet) and location in Northern Ontario. Winters are long, snowy, and very cold for Ontario. Summers are generally warm with cool nights. Winter usually begins around Halloween, lasting through March and into April, though wintry days can sometimes be experienced even later in the season. Snowfall is abundant, starting to fall usually sometime in October and keeps falling into April, with snowfalls in May not uncommon. Hornepayne is one of the driest communities in Ontario, receiving only 656.4 mm (25.84 inches) of precipitation falling on only 105.5 days.

Demographics 

Population:
 Population in 2011: 1,050
 Population in 2006: 1,209
 Population in 2001: 1,362
 Population in 1996: 1,480
 Population in 1991: 1,610

Mother tongue:
 English as first language: 78.3%
 French as first language: 16.3%
 English and French as first language: 0%
 Other as first language: 5.4%

Economy
Hornepayne serves as a railway divisional point on the main Canadian National Railway line. The forestry industry (by way of Haavaldsrud's Timber Company) is the major employer to the local economy. Hunting- and fishing-related tourism in the area (particularly just north of the town in nearby Nagagami Lake Provincial Park) is served by several small companies.

The township of Hornepayne has been the proposed site of a low level nuclear waste storage facility for some time. The town's community liaison group chose to withdraw from this development in the early 1990s, but as of May 2010 the township is still being considered for nuclear waste management/storage.

Transportation 

Hornepayne is served by the Canadian, Canada's transcontinental passenger rail service, which is operated by Via Rail and stops at Hornepayne station. The rail line through the town is part of the Canadian National Railway and was originally constructed by the Canadian Northern Railway in 1915. Hornepayne, a divisional point on the railway, marks the point that two rail subdivisions join with each other: the CN Caramat Subdivision to the west (ending at Nakina) and the CN Ruel Subdivision.

The town is also home to the Hornepayne Municipal Airport.

Popular culture
 Retired ice hockey player Mike McEwen was born in Hornepayne.
 Retired ice hockey player Goldie Goldthorpe (who served as the inspiration for Ogie Ogilthorpe in the 1977 film Slap Shot) was born in Hornepayne.
 Senior Vice President of Hockey Operations for NHL Kris King, was raised in Hornepayne.
 Gordon Lightfoot's song "On the High Seas" mentions Hornepayne with the following lyric "Was it up in Hornepayne, where the trains run on time?"
 Hornepayne was featured on an episode of Survivorman with Les Stroud and a slew of NHL hockey players.

See also
Hornepayne Municipal Airport
Hornepayne Water Aerodrome
Hornepayne railway station
List of townships in Ontario
List of francophone communities in Ontario

References

External links

Municipalities in Algoma District
Single-tier municipalities in Ontario
Township municipalities in Ontario